Inge Thulin, (born November 9, 1953) is the executive chairman of the board at 3M. He has been an executive with the company since 1979 and served as its chairman, president and CEO between 2012 and 2018. He serves as a director for Chevron Corporation and Merck.

Thulin used to be a director for Toro. He holds degrees in business and marketing from the University of Gothenburg in Sweden.

Thulin was a member of President Donald Trump's American Manufacturing Council, before resigning from it on August 16, 2017, in response to the President's statements regarding the Unite the Right rally.

References

1953 births
Living people
3M people
Directors of Chevron Corporation
Swedish chief executives
University of Gothenburg alumni